This is a list of cities in Belgium. City status in Belgium is granted to a select group of municipalities by a royal decree or by an act of law.

See also
 City status in Belgium
 List of most populous municipalities in Belgium
 Municipalities of Belgium
 List of cities in Flanders
 List of cities in Wallonia